European Air Express was a regional airline based in Mönchengladbach, Germany.

History

The airline was established in 1999 and started operations in February 1999. It was wholly owned by Vibro Beteiligungs and had 80 employees (at March 2007).

On 14 June 2007 the airline announced that it would end operations on 30 September 2007. All services were suspended in June and July 2007 ahead of the planned closure.

Destinations
EAE operated scheduled passenger services from and within Germany. Its main base was Düsseldorf-Mönchengladbach Airport, with hubs at Cologne Bonn Airport, Münster Osnabrück International Airport and Stuttgart Airport.

Fleet
The European Air Express fleet included the following aircraft (at March 2007):

5 ATR 42-300
1 Fairchild Metro III

References

External links
European Air Express Fleet

Defunct airlines of Germany
Airlines established in 1999
Airlines disestablished in 2007
German companies established in 1999
German companies disestablished in 2007